Manfred Frederick Jaeger (9 May 1928 – 18 June 2004) was a German-born British film, television, theatre and radio character actor.

Biography
Jaeger was born in Berlin, Germany, but moved to England following Adolf Hitler's rise to power. He was educated at Lord Weymouth's Grammar School, Warminster, and the Guildhall School of Music and Drama, from which he graduated in 1948, becoming a British subject two years later. He made his first theatre appearance in 1949, and his film debut, The Black Tent, in 1956. He went on to make further film, television and radio appearances until retiring in 1996. He died in June 2004 aged 76.

He is well remembered by fans of the science fiction series Doctor Who for his roles in three serials. He appeared as Jano in The Savages in 1966, and as Professor Sorenson in Planet of Evil in 1975. In 1977's The Invisible Enemy, he appeared as Professor Marius, creator of the robot dog K-9; his performance was described by reviewer John Peel as "superb".

Selected filmography

The Iron Petticoat (1956) as Officers' Club Bartender (uncredited)
Private's Progress (1956) as German Sentry (uncredited)
The Black Tent (1956) as Koch – Junior Nazi Officer
The Battle of the River Plate (1956) as Crewman on Graf Spee (uncredited)
The One That Got Away (1957) as German Prisoner
Ice Cold in Alex (1958) as 2nd German Officer
I Was Monty's Double (1958) as Junior German Officer
Play It Cool (1962) as Male Receptionist (uncredited)
The War Lover (1962) as Air Crewman (uncredited)
Mystery Submarine (1963) as Lt. Hence
Farewell Performance (1963) as Paul Warner
The Limbo Line (1968) as Alex
The Looking Glass War (1970) as The Pilot
Song of Norway (1970) as Henrik Ibsen
One of Those Things (1971) as Melchoir
Scorpio (1973) as Novins
Situation (1974) as Klaus
One of Our Dinosaurs Is Missing (1975) as German Radio Newcaster (uncredited)
The Seven-Per-Cent Solution (1976) as Marker
Voyage of the Damned (1976) as Werner Mannheim
The Passage (1979) as German Major (uncredited)
Winterspelt (1979) as Major Robert Wheeler
Nijinsky (1980) as Gabriel Astruc
At the Fountainhead (1980) as Kurt Langsdorf
Indiana Jones and the Last Crusade (1989) as World War I Ace

TV appearances

Big Guns (1958) as Ni Ni Blascoe
Deadline Midnight (1961) as Martin Maxwell
The Avengers (1962–1967) as Benson / Getz
Z-Cars (1965–1974) as George Eames / Sid Phipps / Eric Beazley
Doctor Who (1966–1977) as Jano / Sorenson / Professor Marius
The Inside Man (1969) as Dr James Austen
Callan (1969) as Colonel Max Belukov
Department S (1970) as Major Harwood
Special Branch (1970–74) as Commander Fletcher / Otto Pohl
Dixon of Dock Green (1971) as John Charles Walton
Jason King (1971) as Dacre
The Persuaders! (1971) as Luther
Pretenders (1972) as Joachim
Doomwatch (1972) as Richard Massingham
Warship (1973) as the foreign agent (in Season 1 Episode 4, 'Funny, They All Say That')
Fall of Eagles (1974) as Holstein
The Sweeney (1975) as Goldman
The New Avengers (1976) as Jones
One-Upmanship (1976–1978) as Cogg-Willoughby
The Standard (1978) as Adams
Return of the Saint (1978) as Inspector Grant
The Professionals (1978) as Schuman
Some Mothers Do 'Ave 'Em (1978) as Mr. Barker
The Omega Factor (1979) as Raglan
Yes Minister (1980) as Godfrey Finch
Take the High Road (1980) as Max Langemann
Shoestring (1980) as Doctor Neil Stirling
The Onedin Line (1980) as Max Van Der Rheede
Minder (1982) as Inspector Klingmann
The Gentle Touch (1982) as Herr Inspektor Ritter in episode "Dany" (season 4)
Miss Marple (1984) as Chief Constable Colonel Melchett
 I Woke Up One Morning (1986) as Derek
Keeping Up Appearances (1993) as Millburn

References

External links
 
 Frederick Jaeger at Theatricalia

1928 births
2004 deaths
German emigrants to England
German expatriates in England
English male television actors
People educated at Lord Weymouth's Grammar School
Male actors from Berlin
Alumni of the Guildhall School of Music and Drama